Raquel Silva Queirós (born 16 March 2000) is a Portuguese road cyclist and cross-country mountain biker. She competed in the women's cross-country event at the 2020 Summer Olympics.

Major results
2020
 1st  Time trial, National Road Championships
 1st  National XCO Championships
 1st  National XCE Championships
2021
 1st  National XCO Championships

References

External links

2000 births
Living people
People from Vila do Conde
Cross-country mountain bikers
Portuguese female cyclists
Olympic cyclists of Portugal
Cyclists at the 2020 Summer Olympics
Sportspeople from Porto District